The 2004 San Diego Toreros football team represented the University of San Diego as a member of the North Division of the Pioneer Football League (PFL) during the 2004 NCAA Division I-AA football season. In their first year under head coach Jim Harbaugh, the Toreros compiled a 7–4 record and outscored their opponents 397 to 266.

Schedule

References

San Diego
San Diego Toreros football seasons
San Diego Toreros football